The Bishop of Limerick is an episcopal title which takes its name after the city of Limerick in the Province of Munster, Ireland. In the Roman Catholic Church it still continues as a separate title, but in the Church of Ireland it has been united with other bishoprics.

History
The diocese of Limerick is one of the twenty-four dioceses established at the Synod of Rathbreasail in 1111. After the Reformation, there are parallel apostolic successions: one of the Church of Ireland and the other of the Roman Catholic Church.

In the Church of Ireland, Limerick continued as a separate title until 1661 when it was combined with Ardfert and Aghadoe to form the united bishopric of Limerick, Ardfert and Aghadoe. Since 1976, the Church of Ireland see has been part of the united bishopric of Limerick and Killaloe.

In the Roman Catholic Church, Limerick still remains as a separate title. The current bishop is the Most Reverend Brendan Leahy, Bishop of the Roman Catholic Diocese of Limerick, who was appointed by the Holy See on 10 January 2013 and received episcopal ordination on 14 April 2013.

Pre-Reformation bishops

Post-Reformation bishops

Church of Ireland succession

Roman Catholic succession

Notes
  Some sources state that John Quin resigned by consequences of his infirmities. However, another source states he was forced to resign by King Edward VI in 1551, but was restored by Queen Mary I in 1553.
  Hugh Lacy became bishop of both successions when they were briefly reunited in the reign of Queen Mary I. After the accession of Queen Elizabeth I, he was deprived of the Church of Ireland title in 1571, but continued with the Roman Catholic title until his death in 1580.

References

Bibliography

Further reading
 Begley, John, The Diocese of Limerick, Ancient and Medieval. Dublin: Browne & Nolan, 1906.
 Gillebert of Limerick:the Prelate's Present to the Primate of England, John Lucey, North Munster Antiquarian Journal 6, 2006, pp. 5–14

External links
'Bishops' file at Limerick City Library, Ireland
'Bishop Richard Arthur' file at Limerick City Library, Ireland
'Bishop Jeremiah Newman' file at Limerick City Library, Ireland
'Bishop Terence Albert O'Brien' file at Limerick City Library, Ireland
'Bishop Cornelius O'Dea' file at Limerick City Library, Ireland
'Bishop Edward Thomas O'Dwyer' file at Limerick City Library, Ireland

 
Limerick
Limerick
Religion in County Limerick
Roman Catholic bishops of Limerick
Limerick